Jesús Ezquerra Muela (born 30 November 1990 in Adal-Treto, Cantabria) is a Spanish cyclist, who currently rides for UCI ProTeam . In August 2018, he was named in the startlist for the Vuelta a España.

Major results
2013
 1st Stage 1 (TTT) Czech Cycling Tour
 6th Overall Istrian Spring Trophy
2016
 1st Stage 8 Volta a Portugal
 4th Overall Volta ao Alentejo
 9th Overall GP Liberty Seguros
2018
 4th Circuito de Getxo
  Combativity award Stage 10 Vuelta a España
2020
  Combativity award Stage 4 Vuelta a España
2021 
 6th Vuelta a Murcia
2022
 1st  Sprints classification Vuelta a Asturias
 6th Clàssica Comunitat Valenciana 1969
 9th Trofeo Alcúdia – Port d'Alcúdia
 9th Vuelta a Murcia

Grand Tour general classification results timeline

References

External links

1990 births
Living people
Spanish male cyclists
Cyclists from Cantabria
People from Trasmiera
20th-century Spanish people
21st-century Spanish people